DSP Media (Hangul: DSP 미디어) is a South Korean entertainment company established in 1991 by Lee Ho-yeon. The company operates as a record label, talent agency, music production company, event management and concert production company, and music publishing house. In January 2022, the company was acquired by RBW.

The label is home to artists such as Heo Young-ji, Rachel, KARD and Mirae. Former artists for the label include SoBangCha, ZAM, COCO, Fin.K.L, Sechs Kies, SS501, KARA, Rainbow, A-Jax and April.

History

1991–2009: Formation and early success
Daesung Enterprise was founded in September 1991 by Lee Ho Yeon to provide entertainment to the public. One of their first Korean music groups was SoBangCha (소방차). The group was a hit and is still loved by the older Koreans.

In the late 1990s, Daesung Enterprise saw significant success, and with the success of groups like Sechs Kies, formed in 1997, and Fin.K.L., formed in 1998, it was considered one of the top entertainment labels in South Korea, alongside SM Entertainment. Click-B was formed in August 1999.

In February 1999, the company was renamed DSP Entertainment. After merging with Hoshin Textile Company (호신섬유) in March 2006, DSP Entertainment was renamed DSP Enti.

In 2002, Ha Hyun-gon, Yoo Ho-suk and No Min-hyuk of Click-B left DSP.

In 2006, Fin.K.L members departed DSP Media.

In September 2008, DSP Enti was renamed DSP Media.

2010–present: Change in leadership and acquisition
In March 2010, Lee Ho-yeon suffered a stroke, after which his wife, Choi Mi-kyung began running the company. Lee Ho-yeon was considered a major component of the group's success, which began to see a decline following his retirement from the company due to his stroke. Following Choi becoming president of DSP, several members of the girl group Kara filed a lawsuit to end their contract with DSP.

In 2012, the group Puretty debuted through the anime series Pretty Rhythm: Dear My Future. In January 2014, Puretty officially disbanded with members Jeon Somin, Yoon Chae-kyung and Cho Shiyoon remaining under DSP Media.

In August 2015, DSP debuted another girl group, April. Former Puretty member Jeon Somin was originally part of the line-up, but she left the group in November 2015. She later debuted as part of DSP's co-ed group Kard in July 2017. Former Puretty member Yoon Chae-kyung joined April after their initial debut, in October 2016.

On January 15, 2016 KARA officially disbanded following the expiration of Park Gyuri, Han Seungyeon and Goo Hara's contracts, while Heo Youngji became a soloist under DSP Media.

In the early morning of February 14, 2018, Lee Ho Yeon died at the age of 64, after a long battle with an illness.

On January 26, 2022, it was announced that DSP Media had 39.1% of its shares bought by RBW, which houses idol groups such as Mamamoo, Oneus, Vromance, Onewe and Purple Kiss. DSP Media will be merged into RBW as a subsidiary.

Artists

Recording artists

Soloists
 Heo Young-ji
 BM
 Rachel

Groups
 Kard
 Mirae

Former artists

Former recording artists
 SoBangCha (1987–1996)
 ZAM (1992–1995)
 CO CO (1994–1995)
 MUE (1994–1999)
 IDOL (1995–1997)
 Mountain (1996–?)
 Sechs Kies (1997–2000)
 Fin.K.L (1998–2005)
 Leeds (1999–2000)
 Click-B (1999–2006)
 Oh Jong-hyuk (1999–2020)
 Lee Hyori (2003-2006)
 Shyne (2004–2007)
 SS501 (2005–2010)
 Sunha (2007–2009)
 A'st1 (2008–2009)
 KARA (2007–2016)
 Kim Sung-hee (2007–2008)
 Nicole Jung (2007–2014)
 Kang Ji-young (2008–2014)
 Park Gyu-ri (2007–2016)
 Han Seung-yeon (2007–2016)
 Goo Ha-ra (2008–2016)
 Rainbow (2009-2016, 2019)
 Puretty (2012–2014)
Yoo Hye-in (2012–2014)
Jeon Jae-eun (2012–2014)
Cho Shi-yoon
 Ahn So-jin (2012-2015, her death)
 A-Jax (2012-2019)
 Sungmin (2012–2016)
 Jaehyung (2012–2016)
 Jihu (2012–2016)
 Kasper (2016–2018)
 April (2015–2022)
 Lee Hyun-joo (2015–2021)
 Chaewon (2015–2022)
 Naeun (2015–2022)
 Yena (2015–2022)
 Jinsol (2015–2022)
 Chaekyung (2015–2022) (Debut at others group before join April)

Former actors
 Park So-hyun
 Oh Hyun-kyung
 Kim Hyu Soo (1997–?)
 Jung Hye Won (2010–?)
 Park Jong-chan (2013-?)
 Choi Bae-young
 Baek Seungdo
 Song Chan-ik

Filmography
Emergency Act 19 (Film, 2002)
Drama Three Leaf Clover (SBS, 2005)
My girl (SBS, 2005)
She (SBS, 2006)
Yeon Gae So Mun (SBS, 2006)
Surgeon Bong Dal-hee (SBS, 2007)
Bad couple (SBS, 2007)
Heartbreak Library (Film, 2008)
Making the Star (MBC, 2012)
Kara Project (MBC, 2014)

References

External links
  
  DSP Media official homepage – Japan
 
 

 
Companies based in Seoul
Electronic dance music record labels
Film production companies of South Korea
Labels distributed by Kakao M
Music companies of South Korea
K-pop record labels
Publishing companies established in 1991
Record labels established in 1991
South Korean record labels
Synth-pop record labels
Talent agencies of South Korea
Television production companies of South Korea
South Korean companies established in 1991